Zora J. Murff (born 1987) is an American photographer, curator, and educator. He is currently based in Fayetteville, Arkansas and teaches photography at the University of Arkansas. Murff's work focuses on social and cultural constructs including race and criminality, and grapples with how photography is used as a technology to perpetuate intentions and desires. His series, Corrections, is a visual exploration of kids in the juvenile criminal justice system in Eastern Iowa.

Life and work 
Murff was born in 1987 in Des Moines, Iowa, to an African American family. He studied for a BS in Psychology from Iowa State University. 

Following his graduation in 2010, took a job as a Tracker for Linn County Juvenile Detention and Diversion Services in Cedar Rapids, Iowa. Murff enrolled at the University of Iowa to study photography at the same time. He photographed the children that he worked with, which resulted in Corrections, his final-year BA project, "about a system that too often fails the disenfranchised youth to whom it has a duty of care." The Corrections photo series images were taken from 2013 to 2015. "about a system that too often fails the disenfranchised youth to whom it has a duty of care." The Corrections photo series images were taken from 2013 to 2015, and explores a "contradictory relationship that Murff acknowledges [...], between his effort to build trust with the young people and his position as a tracker to make sure they followed court orders, while securing their willingness to be photographed.” He published the work as a monograph in 2015 with Aint-Bad Magazine. Murff has continued to create work about incarceration in America.

Following his studies at the University of Iowa, Murff enrolled in the MFA studio art program at the University of Nebraska–Lincoln. In April 2018, he launched his thesis exhibition Re-Making the Mark, a mixture of photography and sculpture focused on the historical impacts of redlining in North Omaha, a Historically African-American neighborhood in Omaha, Nebraska. His second monograph Lost: Omaha, includes some work from Re-Making the Mark. His later monograph, "At No Point In Between" also includes work originally contained within his series Lost: Omaha. 

Murff began teaching Photography at the University of Arkansas' School of Art in 2018. He is also a co-curator of Strange Fire Artist Collective (formed in 2015) with artists Jess T. Dugan and Rafael Soldi, and curator Hamidah Glasgow. In 2019, he was artist-in-resident at Light Work in Syracuse, NY.

In 2020, Murff was awarded the inaugural Next Step Award from Aperture magazine, Baxter St at the Camera Club of New York, and the 7|G Foundation and, in 2023, Murff was awarded the Documentary Practice and Visual Journalism Infinity Award from the International Center of Photography.

Publications 
 Corrections. Savanna, GA: Aint-Bad, 2015. . Edition of 450 copies. With a foreword by Pete Brook.
 Lost: Omaha. Brooklyn, NY: Kris Graves, 2018. One volume in a collection of 10. With an essay by Lisa Riordan Seville. . First edition, 125 copies. First edition (second printing), 100 copies.
At No Point In Between. Dais, 2019. . With an essay by Terence Washington and an afterword by Lisa Riordan Seville. Edition of 155 copies.
 True Colors (or, Affirmations in a Crisis). Brooklyn, NY: Aperture, 2022. First edition.

References

External links

21st-century American photographers
Photographers from Iowa
1987 births
Living people
Iowa State University alumni
University of Iowa alumni
People from Fayetteville, Arkansas
University of Arkansas faculty
Artists from Des Moines, Iowa
African-American photographers